Turkish viper may refer to:

 Vipera barani or Baran's adder, a venomous viper species found only in Turkey
 Montivipera xanthina or Ottoman viper, a venomous species found in northeastern Greece and Turkey, as well as certain islands in the Aegean Sea